"Cherokee" is a 1987 single released by the Swedish band Europe. It was the fourth single released internationally from the album The Final Countdown, and reached number 72 on the Billboard Hot 100 chart in the United States.

The song was written by vocalist Joey Tempest in 1985, and was in fact the last song written for the album. The video for "Cherokee" was filmed in September 1987, in Almería, Spain. It was filmed a half mile from where Sergio Leone shot the famous Clint Eastwood Spaghetti Western A Fistful of Dollars. When filming the scene where the horses run through the valley, someone accidentally set some brush near the set on fire. The entire video crew, including band members, had to fight the fire by quickly digging a trench around the fire to stop it spreading. The video is very historically inaccurate. It showed the Cherokee as plains Indians, living in teepees on the desert. The Cherokee originally lived in the wooded, southern Appalachian Mountains. They were forcibly moved to the wooded, rolling hills of eastern Oklahoma. The Cherokee never used teepees.

On 30 July 2007, "Cherokee" and "The Final Countdown" were used in a preview for Superbad following Raw.

At the beginning of the song, drummer Ian Haugland says: "Nu ska vi spela!" which means "We're gonna play now!" in Swedish.

Cover versions
"Cherokee" was sampled in the song "I Believe" by the French electropop duo Galleon.

Personnel
Joey Tempest − vocals
John Norum − guitar
John Levén − bass
Mic Michaeli − keyboard
Ian Haugland − drums

Chart positions

References

1987 singles
Europe (band) songs
Epic Records singles
Songs written by Joey Tempest
1986 songs